Peesapati Narasimha Murty (Telugu: పీసపాటి నరసింహమూర్తి) (10 July 1920 – 28 September 2007) was an Indian actor known for his works in Telugu theatre, and Telugu cinema. He was trained under Kilambi Krishnamacharyulu in 1934 and started his acting career with Rangoon Rowdy in 1938. In 1946, he enacted as Sri Krishna in Pandavodyoga Vijayalu.

He was born in a Vantaram village near Balijipeta, Vizianagaram district in 1920. He received many awards including the Sangeet Natak Akademi Award in 1986. Andhra University honoured him with Kala Prapoorna in 1993.

References

Telugu male actors
Indian male stage actors
1920 births
2007 deaths
Recipients of the Sangeet Natak Akademi Award
Male actors from Andhra Pradesh
People from Vizianagaram district
Andhra University alumni
Indian male film actors
Male actors in Telugu cinema
20th-century Indian male actors
Male actors in Telugu theatre
People from Uttarandhra